Bab Alioua is one of the gates of the medina of Tunis, the capital of Tunisia.

Bab Alioua, literally meaning "Gate of the Little Storey", built by the sultan hafside Abū lshâq Ibrâhîm al-Mustansir (1349–1369) at the eastern edge of the ramparts, owes its name to the first floor that overcame it. It was through this door that Hayreddin Barbarossa entered Tunis in 1534.

References

External links

Alioua